This is a timeline of quantum computing.

1960s

1968

 Stephen Wiesner invents conjugate coding. (published in ACM SIGACT News 15(1):78–88)

1970s

1970 

 James Park articulates the no-cloning theorem.

1973 

 Alexander Holevo publishes a paper showing that n qubits can carry more than n classical bits of information, but at most n classical bits are accessible (a result known as "Holevo's theorem" or "Holevo's bound").
 Charles H. Bennett shows that computation can be done reversibly.

1975 

 R. P. Poplavskii publishes "Thermodynamical models of information processing" (in Russian) which showed the computational infeasibility of simulating quantum systems on classical computers, due to the superposition principle.

1976 

 Polish mathematical physicist Roman Stanisław Ingarden publishes the paper "Quantum Information Theory" in Reports on Mathematical Physics, vol. 10, 43–72, 1976. (The paper was submitted in 1975.) It is one of the first attempts at creating a quantum information theory, showing that Shannon information theory cannot directly be generalized to the quantum case, but rather that it is possible to construct a quantum information theory, which is a generalization of Shannon's theory, within the formalism of a generalized quantum mechanics of open systems and a generalized concept of observables (the so-called semi-observables).

1980s

1980
 Paul Benioff describes the first quantum mechanical model of a computer. In this work, Benioff showed that a computer could operate under the laws of quantum mechanics by describing a Schrödinger equation description of Turing machines, laying a foundation for further work in quantum computing. The paper was submitted in June 1979 and published in April 1980. 
 Yuri Manin briefly motivates the idea of quantum computing.
 Tommaso Toffoli introduces the reversible Toffoli gate, which (together with initialized ancilla bits) is functionally complete for reversible classical computation.

1981
 At the First Conference on the Physics of Computation, held at MIT in May, Paul Benioff and Richard Feynman give talks on quantum computing. Benioff's built on his earlier 1980 work showing that a computer can operate under the laws of quantum mechanics. The talk was titled “Quantum mechanical Hamiltonian models of discrete processes that erase their own histories: application to Turing machines”. In Feynman's talk, he observed that it appeared to be impossible to efficiently simulate an evolution of a quantum system on a classical computer, and he proposed a basic model for a quantum computer.

1982
 Paul Benioff further develops his original model of a quantum mechanical Turing machine.
 William Wootters and Wojciech Zurek, and independently Dennis Dieks rediscover the no-cloning theorem.

1984
 Charles Bennett and Gilles Brassard employ Wiesner's conjugate coding for distribution of cryptographic keys.

1985
 David Deutsch, at the University of Oxford, describes the first universal quantum computer. Just as a Universal Turing machine can simulate any other Turing machine efficiently (Church-Turing thesis), so the universal quantum computer is able to simulate any other quantum computer with at most a polynomial slowdown.
 Asher Peres points out need for quantum error correction schemes and discusses a repetition code for amplitude errors.

1988
 Yoshihisa Yamamoto and K. Igeta propose the first physical realization of a quantum computer, including Feynman's CNOT gate. Their approach uses atoms and photons and is the progenitor of modern quantum computing and networking protocols using photons to transmit qubits and atoms to perform two-qubit operations.

1989
 Gerard J. Milburn proposes a quantum-optical realization of a Fredkin gate.
 Bikas K. Chakrabarti & collaborators from Saha Institute of Nuclear Physics, Kolkata, propose the idea that quantum fluctuations could help explore rugged energy landscapes by escaping from local minima of glassy systems having tall but thin barriers by tunneling (instead of climbing over using thermal excitations), suggesting the effectiveness of quantum annealing over classical simulated annealing.

1990s

1991
 Artur Ekert at the University of Oxford, proposes entanglement-based secure communication.

1992 
 David Deutsch and Richard Jozsa propose a computational problem that can be solved efficiently with the determinist Deutsch–Jozsa algorithm on a quantum computer, but for which no deterministic classical algorithm is possible. This was perhaps the earliest result in the computational complexity of quantum computers, proving that they were capable of performing some well-defined computational task more efficiently than any classical computer.

1993
 Dan Simon, at Université de Montréal, invents an oracle problem, Simon's problem, for which a quantum computer would be exponentially faster than a conventional computer. This algorithm introduces the main ideas which were then developed in Peter Shor's factorization algorithm.

1994
 Peter Shor, at AT&T's Bell Labs in New Jersey, publishes Shor's algorithm. It allows a quantum computer to factor large integers quickly. It solves both the factoring problem and the discrete log problem. The algorithm can theoretically break many of the cryptosystems in use today. Its invention sparked a tremendous interest in quantum computers.
 First United States Government workshop on quantum computing is organized by NIST in Gaithersburg, Maryland, in autumn.
 Isaac Chuang and Yoshihisa Yamamoto propose a quantum-optical realization of a quantum computer to implement Deutsch's algorithm. Their work introduces dual-rail encoding for photonic qubits.
 In December, Ignacio Cirac, at University of Castilla-La Mancha at Ciudad Real, and Peter Zoller at the University of Innsbruck propose an experimental realization of the controlled-NOT gate with cold trapped ions.

1995
 The first United States Department of Defense workshop on quantum computing and quantum cryptography is organized by United States Army physicists Charles M. Bowden, Jonathan P. Dowling, and Henry O. Everitt; it takes place in February at the University of Arizona in Tucson.
 Peter Shor proposes the first schemes for quantum error correction.
 Christopher Monroe and David Wineland at NIST (Boulder, Colorado) experimentally realize the first quantum logic gate – the controlled-NOT gate – with trapped ions, following the Cirac-Zoller proposal.

1996
 Lov Grover, at Bell Labs, invents the quantum database search algorithm. The quadratic speedup is not as dramatic as the speedup for factoring, discrete logs, or physics simulations. However, the algorithm can be applied to a much wider variety of problems. Any problem that can be solved by random, brute-force search, may take advantage of this quadratic speedup (in the number of search queries).
 The United States Government, particularly in a joint partnership of the Army Research Office (now part of the Army Research Laboratory) and the National Security Agency, issues the first public call for research proposals in quantum information processing.
 Andrew Steane designs Steane codes for error correction.
 David P. DiVincenzo, from IBM, proposes a list of minimal requirements for creating a quantum computer, now called DiVincenzo's criteria.

1997
 David Cory, Amr Fahmy and Timothy Havel, and at the same time Neil Gershenfeld and Isaac L. Chuang at MIT publish the first papers realizing gates for quantum computers based on bulk nuclear spin resonance, or thermal ensembles. The technology is based on a nuclear magnetic resonance (NMR) machine, which is similar to the medical magnetic resonance imaging machine.
 Alexei Kitaev describes the principles of topological quantum computation as a method for dealing with the problem of decoherence.
 Daniel Loss and David P. DiVincenzo propose the Loss-DiVincenzo quantum computer, using as qubits the intrinsic spin-1/2 degree of freedom of individual electrons confined to quantum dots.

1998
 First experimental demonstration of a quantum algorithm. A working 2-qubit NMR quantum computer is used to solve Deutsch's problem by Jonathan A. Jones and Michele Mosca at Oxford University and shortly after by Isaac L. Chuang at IBM's Almaden Research Center and Mark Kubinec and the University of California, Berkeley together with coworkers at Stanford University and MIT.
 First working 3-qubit NMR computer.
 Bruce Kane proposes a silicon-based nuclear spin quantum computer, using nuclear spins of individual phosphorus atoms in silicon as the qubits and donor electrons to mediate the coupling between qubits.
 First execution of Grover's algorithm on an NMR computer.
 Hidetoshi Nishimori & colleagues from Tokyo Institute of Technology showed that a quantum annealing algorithm can perform better than classical simulated annealing under certain conditions.
 Daniel Gottesman and Emanuel Knill independently prove that a certain subclass of quantum computations can be efficiently emulated with classical resources (Gottesman–Knill theorem).

1999
 Samuel L. Braunstein and collaborators show that none of the bulk NMR experiments performed to date contained any entanglement, the quantum states being too strongly mixed. This is seen as evidence that NMR computers would likely not yield a benefit over classical computers. It remains an open question, however, whether entanglement is necessary for quantum computational speedup.
 Gabriel Aeppli, Thomas Felix Rosenbaum and colleagues demonstrate experimentally the basic concepts of quantum annealing in a condensed matter system.
 Yasunobu Nakamura and Jaw-Shen Tsai demonstrate that a superconducting circuit can be used as a qubit.

2000s

2000
 Arun K. Pati and Samuel L. Braunstein proved the quantum no-deleting theorem. This is dual to the no-cloning theorem which shows that one cannot delete a copy of an unknown qubit. Together with the stronger no-cloning theorem, the no-deleting theorem has important implication, i.e., quantum information can neither be created nor be destroyed.
 First working 5-qubit NMR computer demonstrated at the Technical University of Munich.
 First execution of order finding (part of Shor's algorithm) at IBM's Almaden Research Center and Stanford University.
 First working 7-qubit NMR computer demonstrated at the Los Alamos National Laboratory.
 The standard textbook, Quantum Computation and Quantum Information, by Michael Nielsen and Isaac Chuang is published.

2001
 First execution of Shor's algorithm at IBM's Almaden Research Center and Stanford University. The number 15 was factored using 1018 identical molecules, each containing seven active nuclear spins.
 Noah Linden and Sandu Popescu proved that the presence of entanglement is a necessary condition for a large class of quantum protocols. This, coupled with Braunstein's result (see 1999 above), called the validity of NMR quantum computation into question.
 Emanuel Knill, Raymond Laflamme, and Gerard Milburn show that optical quantum computing is possible with single-photon sources, linear optical elements, and single-photon detectors, launching the field of linear optical quantum computing.
 Robert Raussendorf and Hans Jürgen Briegel propose measurement-based quantum computation.

2002
 The Quantum Information Science and Technology Roadmapping Project, involving some of the main participants in the field, laid out the Quantum computation roadmap.
 The Institute for Quantum Computing was established at the University of Waterloo in Waterloo, Ontario by Mike Lazaridis, Raymond Laflamme and Michele Mosca.

2003
 Implementation of the Deutsch–Jozsa algorithm on an ion-trap quantum computer at the University of Innsbruck
 Todd D. Pittman and collaborators at Johns Hopkins University, Applied Physics Laboratory and independently Jeremy L. O'Brien and collaborators at the University of Queensland, demonstrate quantum controlled-not gates using only linear optical elements.
 First implementation of a CNOT quantum gate according to the Cirac–Zoller proposal by a group at the University of Innsbruck led by Rainer Blatt.
 DARPA Quantum Network becomes fully operational on October 23, 2003.
 The Institute for Quantum Optics and Quantum Information (IQOQI) was established in Innsbruck and Vienna, Austria, by the founding directors Rainer Blatt, Hans Jürgen Briegel, Rudolf Grimm, Anton Zeilinger and Peter Zoller.

2004
 First working pure state NMR quantum computer (based on parahydrogen) demonstrated at Oxford University and University of York.
 Physicists at the University of Innsbruck show deterministic quantum-state teleportation between a pair of trapped calcium ions.
 First five-photon entanglement demonstrated by Jian-Wei Pan's group at the University of Science and Technology of China, the minimal number of qubits required for universal quantum error correction.

2005
 University of Illinois at Urbana–Champaign scientists demonstrate quantum entanglement of multiple characteristics, potentially allowing multiple qubits per particle.
 Two teams of physicists measured the capacitance of a Josephson junction for the first time. The methods could be used to measure the state of quantum bits in a quantum computer without disturbing the state.
 In December, W-states of quantum registers with up to 8 qubits implemented using trapped ions are demonstrated at the Institute for Quantum Optics and Quantum Information and the University of Innsbruck in Austria.
 Harvard University and Georgia Institute of Technology researchers succeeded in transferring quantum information between "quantum memories" – from atoms to photons and back again.

2006
 Materials Science Department of Oxford University, cage a qubit in a "buckyball" (a molecule of buckminsterfullerene), and demonstrated quantum "bang-bang" error correction.

 Researchers from the University of Illinois at Urbana–Champaign use the Zeno Effect, repeatedly measuring the properties of a photon to gradually change it without actually allowing the photon to reach the program, to search a database without actually "running" the quantum computer.
 Vlatko Vedral of the University of Leeds and colleagues at the universities of Porto and Vienna found that the photons in ordinary laser light can be quantum mechanically entangled with the vibrations of a macroscopic mirror.
 Samuel L. Braunstein at the University of York along with the University of Tokyo and the Japan Science and Technology Agency gave the first experimental demonstration of quantum telecloning.
 Professors at the University of Sheffield develop a means to efficiently produce and manipulate individual photons at high efficiency at room temperature.
 New error checking method theorized for Josephson junction computers.
 First 12 qubit quantum computer benchmarked by researchers at the Institute for Quantum Computing and the Perimeter Institute for Theoretical Physics in Waterloo, as well as MIT, Cambridge.
 Two dimensional ion trap developed for quantum computing.
 Seven atoms placed in stable line, a step on the way to constructing a quantum gate, at the University of Bonn.
 A team at Delft University of Technology in the Netherlands created a device that can manipulate the "up" or "down" spin-states of electrons on quantum dots.
 University of Arkansas develops quantum dot molecules.
 Spinning new theory on particle spin brings science closer to quantum computing.
 University of Copenhagen develops quantum teleportation between photons and atoms.
 University of Camerino scientists develop theory of macroscopic object entanglement, which has implications for the development of quantum repeaters.
 Tai-Chang Chiang, at Illinois at Urbana–Champaign, finds that quantum coherence can be maintained in mixed-material systems.
 Cristophe Boehme, University of Utah, demonstrates the feasibility of reading spin-data on a silicon-phosphorus quantum computer.

2007
 Subwavelength waveguide developed for light.
 Single-photon emitter for optical fibers developed.
 Six-photon one-way quantum computer is created in lab.
 New material proposed for quantum computing.
 Single-atom single-photon server devised.
 First use of Deutsch's Algorithm in a cluster state quantum computer.
 University of Cambridge develops electron quantum pump.
 Superior method of qubit coupling developed.
 Successful demonstration of controllably coupled qubits.
 Breakthrough in applying spin-based electronics to silicon.
 Scientists demonstrate quantum state exchange between light and matter.
 Diamond quantum register developed.
 Controlled-NOT quantum gates on a pair of superconducting quantum bits realized.
 Scientists contain, study hundreds of individual atoms in 3D array.
 Nitrogen in buckyball molecule used in quantum computing.
 Large number of electrons quantum coupled.
 Spin–orbit interaction of electrons measured.
 Atoms quantum manipulated in laser light.
 Light pulses used to control electron spins.
 Quantum effects demonstrated across tens of nanometers.
 Light pulses used to accelerate quantum computing development.
 Quantum RAM blueprint unveiled.
 Model of quantum transistor developed.
 Long distance entanglement demonstrated.
 Photonic quantum computing used to factor number by two independent labs.
 Quantum bus developed by two independent labs.
 Superconducting quantum cable developed.
 Transmission of qubits demonstrated.
 Superior qubit material devised.
 Single-electron qubit memory.
 Bose–Einstein condensate quantum memory developed.
 D-Wave Systems demonstrates use of a 28-qubit quantum annealing computer.
 New cryonic method reduces decoherence and increases interaction distance, and thus quantum computing speed.
 Photonic quantum computer demonstrated.
 Graphene quantum dot spin qubits proposed.

2008
 The HHL algorithm for solving linear equations was published
 Graphene quantum dot qubits
 Quantum bit stored
 3D qubit-qutrit entanglement demonstrated
 Analog quantum computing devised
 Control of quantum tunneling
 Entangled memory developed
 Superior NOT gate developed
 Qutrits developed
 Quantum logic gate in optical fiber
 Superior quantum Hall Effect discovered
 Enduring spin states in quantum dots
 Molecular magnets proposed for quantum RAM
 Quasiparticles offer hope of stable quantum computer
 Image storage may have better storage of qubits
 Quantum entangled images
 Quantum state intentionally altered in molecule
 Electron position controlled in silicon circuit
 Superconducting electronic circuit pumps microwave photons
 Amplitude spectroscopy developed
 Superior quantum computer test developed
 Optical frequency comb devised
 Quantum Darwinism supported
 Hybrid qubit memory developed
 Qubit stored for over 1 second in atomic nucleus
 Faster electron spin qubit switching and reading developed
 Possible non-entanglement quantum computing
 D-Wave Systems claims to have produced a 128 qubit computer chip, though this claim has yet to be verified.

2009
 Carbon 12 purified for longer coherence times
 Lifetime of qubits extended to hundreds of milliseconds
 Quantum control of photons
 Quantum entanglement demonstrated over 240 micrometres
 Qubit lifetime extended by factor of 1000
 First electronic quantum processor created
 Six-photon graph state entanglement used to simulate the fractional statistics of anyons living in artificial spin-lattice models
 Single-molecule optical transistor
 NIST reads, writes individual qubits
 NIST demonstrates multiple computing operations on qubits
 First large-scale topological cluster state quantum architecture developed for atom-optics
 A combination of all of the fundamental elements required to perform scalable quantum computing through the use of qubits stored in the internal states of trapped atomic ions shown
 Researchers at University of Bristol demonstrate Shor's algorithm on a silicon photonic chip
 Quantum Computing with an Electron Spin Ensemble
 Photon machine gun developed for quantum computing
 First universal programmable quantum computer unveiled
 Scientists electrically control quantum states of electrons
 Google collaborates with D-Wave Systems on image search technology using quantum computing
 A method for synchronizing the properties of multiple coupled CJJ rf-SQUID flux qubits with a small spread of device parameters due to fabrication variations was demonstrated
 Realization of Universal Ion Trap Quantum Computation with Decoherence Free Qubits
 First chip-scale quantum computer

2010s

2010
 Ion trapped in optical trap
 Optical quantum computer with three qubits calculated the energy spectrum of molecular hydrogen to high precision
 First germanium laser brings us closer to optical computers
 Single-electron qubit developed
 Quantum state in macroscopic object
 New quantum computer cooling method developed
 Racetrack ion trap developed
 Evidence for a Moore-Read state in the  quantum Hall plateau, which would be suitable for topological quantum computation
 Quantum interface between a single photon and a single atom demonstrated
 LED quantum entanglement demonstrated
 Multiplexed design speeds up transmission of quantum information through a quantum communications channel
 Two photon optical chip
 Microfabricated planar ion traps 
 Boson sampling technique proposed by Aaronson and Arkhipov.
 Quantum dot qubits manipulated electrically, not magnetically

2011
 Entanglement in a solid-state spin ensemble
 NOON photons in superconducting quantum integrated circuit
 Quantum antenna
 Multimode quantum interference
 Magnetic Resonance applied to quantum computing
 Quantum pen
 Atomic "Racing Dual"
 14 qubit register
 D-Wave claims to have developed quantum annealing and introduces their product called D-Wave One. The company claims this is the first commercially available quantum computer
 Repetitive error correction demonstrated in a quantum processor
 Diamond quantum computer memory demonstrated
 Qmodes developed
 Decoherence suppressed
 Simplification of controlled operations
 Ions entangled using microwaves
 Practical error rates achieved
 Quantum computer employing Von Neumann architecture
 Quantum spin Hall topological insulator
 Two Diamonds Linked by Quantum Entanglement could help develop photonic processors

2012
 D-Wave claims a quantum computation using 84 qubits.
 Physicists create a working transistor from a single atom
 A method for manipulating the charge of nitrogen vacancy-centres in diamond
 Reported creation of a 300 qubit/particle quantum simulator.
 Demonstration of topologically protected qubits with an eight-photon entanglement, a robust approach to practical quantum computing
 1QB Information Technologies (1QBit) founded. World's first dedicated quantum computing software company.
 First design of a quantum repeater system without a need for quantum memories
 Decoherence suppressed for 2 seconds at room temperature by manipulating Carbon-13 atoms with lasers.
 Theory of Bell-based randomness expansion with reduced assumption of measurement independence.
 New low overhead method for fault-tolerant quantum logic developed, called lattice surgery

2013
 Coherence time of 39 minutes at room temperature (and 3 hours at cryogenic temperatures) demonstrated for an ensemble of impurity-spin qubits in isotopically purified silicon.
 Extension of time for qubit maintained in superimposed state for ten times longer than what has ever been achieved before
 First resource analysis of a large-scale quantum algorithm using explicit fault-tolerant, error-correction protocols was developed for factoring

2014
 Documents leaked by Edward Snowden confirm the Penetrating Hard Targets project, by which the National Security Agency seeks to develop a quantum computing capability for cryptography purposes.
 Researchers in Japan and Austria publish the first large-scale quantum computing architecture for a diamond-based system
 Scientists at the University of Innsbruck do quantum computations on a topologically encoded qubit which is encoded in entangled states distributed over seven trapped-ion qubits

2015

 Optically addressable nuclear spins in a solid with a six-hour coherence time.
 Quantum information encoded by simple electrical pulses.
 Quantum error detection code using a square lattice of four superconducting qubits.
 D-Wave Systems Inc. announced on June 22 that it had broken the 1,000-qubit barrier.
 A two-qubit silicon logic gate is successfully developed.
 A quantum computer, along with quantum superposition and entanglement, is emulated by a classical analog computer, with the result that the fully classical system behaves like a true quantum computer.

2016
 Physicists led by Rainer Blatt joined forces with scientists at MIT, led by Isaac Chuang, to efficiently implement Shor's algorithm in an ion-trap-based quantum computer.
 IBM releases the Quantum Experience, an online interface to their superconducting systems. The system is immediately used to publish new protocols in quantum information processing
 Google, using an array of 9 superconducting qubits developed by the Martinis group and UCSB, simulates a hydrogen molecule.
 Scientists in Japan and Australia invent the quantum version of a Sneakernet communications system

2017
 D-Wave Systems Inc. announces general commercial availability of the D-Wave 2000Q quantum annealer, which it claims has 2000 qubits.
 Blueprint for a microwave trapped ion quantum computer published.
 IBM unveils 17-qubit quantum computer—and a better way of benchmarking it.
 Scientists build a microchip that generates two entangled qudits each with 10 states, for 100 dimensions total.
 Microsoft reveals Q#, a quantum programming language integrated with Visual Studio. Programs can be executed locally on a 32-qubit simulator, or a 40-qubit simulator on Azure.

 IBM reveals a working 50-qubit quantum computer that can maintain its quantum state for 90 microseconds.
 First teleportation using a satellite, connecting ground stations over a distance of 1400 km apart. Previous experiments was at Earth, at shorter distances.

2018
 MIT scientists report the discovery of a new triple-photon form of light.
 Oxford researchers successfully use a trapped-ion technique, where they place two charged atoms in a state of quantum entanglement to speed up logic gates by a factor of 20 to 60 times, as compared with the previous best gates, translated to 1.6 microseconds long, with 99.8% precision.
 QuTech successfully tests a silicon-based 2-spin-qubit processor.
 Google announces the creation of a 72-qubit quantum chip, called "Bristlecone", achieving a new record.
 Intel begins testing a silicon-based spin-qubit processor manufactured in the company's D1D Fab in Oregon.
 Intel confirms development of a 49-qubit superconducting test chip, called "Tangle Lake". 
 Japanese researchers demonstrate universal holonomic quantum gates.
 Integrated photonic platform for quantum information with continuous variables.
 On December 17, 2018, the company IonQ introduced the first commercial trapped-ion quantum computer, with a program length of over 60 two-qubit gates, 11 fully connected qubits, 55 addressable pairs, one-qubit gate error <0.03% and two-qubit gate error <1.0%
 On December 21, 2018, the National Quantum Initiative Act was signed into law by President Donald Trump, establishing the goals and priorities for a 10-year plan to accelerate the development of quantum information science and technology applications in the United States.

2019

 IBM unveils its first commercial quantum computer, the IBM Q System One, designed by UK-based Map Project Office and Universal Design Studio and manufactured by Goppion.
 Austrian physicists demonstrate self-verifying, hybrid, variational quantum simulation of lattice models in condensed matter and high-energy physics using a feedback loop between a classical computer and a quantum co-processor.
 Quantum Darwinism observed in diamond at room temperature.
 A paper by Google's quantum computer research team was briefly available in late September 2019, claiming the project has reached quantum supremacy.
 IBM reveals its biggest quantum computer yet, consisting of 53 qubits. The system goes online in October 2019. 
 University of Science and Technology of China researchers demonstrate boson sampling with 14 detected photons.

2020s

2020

 UNSW Sydney develops a way of producing 'hot qubits' – quantum devices that operate at 1.5 kelvins.
 Griffith University, UNSW and UTS, in partnership with seven universities in the United States, develop noise cancelling for quantum bits via machine learning, taking quantum noise in a quantum chip down to 0%.
 UNSW performs electric nuclear resonance to control single atoms in electronic devices.
 University of Tokyo and Australian scientists create and successfully test a solution to the quantum wiring problem, creating a 2D structure for qubits. Such structure can be built using existing integrated circuit technology and has a considerably lower cross-talk.
 16 January – Quantum physicists report the first direct splitting of one photon into three using spontaneous parametric down-conversion and which may have applications in quantum technology.
 11 February – Quantum engineers report that they have created artificial atoms in silicon quantum dots for quantum computing and that artificial atoms with a higher number of electrons can be more stable qubits than previously thought possible. Enabling silicon-based quantum computers may make it possible to reuse the manufacturing technology of "classical" modern-day computer chips among other advantages.
 14 February – Quantum physicists develop a novel single-photon source which may allow to bridge semiconductor-based quantum-computers that use photons by converting the state of an electron spin to the polarisation of a photon. They show that they can generate a single photon in a controlled way without the need for randomly formed quantum dots or structural defects in diamonds.
 25 February – Scientists visualize a quantum measurement: by taking snapshots of ion states at different times of measurement via coupling of a trapped ion qutrit to the photon environment they show that the changes of the degrees of superpositions and therefore of probabilities of states after measurement happens gradually under the measurement influence.
 2 March – Scientists report to have achieved repeated quantum nondemolition measurements of an electron's spin in a silicon quantum dot: measurements that don't change the electron's spin in the process.
 11 March – Quantum engineers report to have managed to control the nucleus of a single atom using only electric fields. This was first suggested to be possible in 1961 and may be used for silicon quantum computers that use single-atom spins without needing oscillating magnetic fields which may be especially useful for nanodevices, for precise sensors of electric and magnetic fields as well as for fundamental inquiries into quantum nature.
The Rydberg sensor may potentially be used detect communications signals as it could reliably detect signals over the entire spectrum and compare favourably with other established electric field sensor technologies, such as electro-optic crystals and dipole antenna-coupled passive electronics.
 23 March – Researchers report that they have found a way to correct for signal loss in a prototype quantum node that can catch, store and entangle bits of quantum information. Their concepts could be used for key components of quantum repeaters in quantum networks and extend their longest possible range.
 15 April – Researchers demonstrate a proof-of-concept silicon quantum processor unit cell which works at 1.5 kelvins – many times warmer than common quantum processors that are being developed. It may enable integrating classical control electronics with the qubit array and reduce costs substantially. The cooling requirements necessary for quantum computing have been called one of the toughest roadblocks in the field.
 16 April – Scientists prove the existence of the Rashba effect in bulk perovskites. Previously researchers have hypothesized that the materials' extraordinary electronic, magnetic and optical properties – which make it a commonly used material for solar cells and quantum electronics – are related to this effect which to date hasn't been proven to be present in the material.
 8 May – Researchers report to have developed a proof-of-concept of a quantum radar using quantum entanglement and microwaves which may potentially be useful for the development of improved radar systems, security scanners and medical imaging systems.
 12 May – Researchers report to have developed a method to selectively manipulate a layered manganite's correlated electrons' spin state while leaving its orbital state intact using femtosecond X-ray laser pulses. This may indicate that orbitronics – using variations in the orientations of orbitals – may be used as the basic unit of information in novel IT devices.
 19 May – Researchers report to have developed the first integrated silicon on-chip low-noise single-photon source compatible with large-scale quantum photonics.
 11 June – Scientists report the generation of rubidium Bose–Einstein condensates (BECs) in the Cold Atom Laboratory aboard the International Space Station under microgravity which could enable improved research of BECs and quantum mechanics, whose physics are scaled to macroscopic scales in BECs, support long-term investigations of few-body physics, support the development of techniques for atom-wave interferometry and atom lasers and has verified the successful operation of the laboratory.
 15 June – Scientists report the development of the smallest synthetic molecular motor, consisting of 12 atoms and a rotor of 4 atoms, shown to be capable of being powered by an electric current using an electron scanning microscope and moving even with very low amounts of energy due to quantum tunneling.
 17 June – Quantum scientists report the development of a system that entangles two photon quantum communication nodes through a microwave cable that can send information in between without the photons ever being sent through, or occupying, the cable. On 12 June it was reported that they also, for the first time, entangled two phonons as well as erase information from their measurement after the measurement has been completed using delayed-choice quantum erasure.
 13 August – Universal coherence protection is reported to have been achieved in a solid-state spin qubit, a modification that allows quantum systems to stay operational (or "coherent") for 10,000 times longer than before.
 26 August – Scientists report that ionizing radiation from environmental radioactive materials and cosmic rays may substantially limit the coherence times of qubits if they aren't shielded adequately.
 28 August – Quantum engineers working for Google report the largest chemical simulation on a quantum computer – a Hartree–Fock approximation with Sycamore paired with a classical computer that analyzed results to provide new parameters for the 12-qubit system.
 2 September – Researchers present an eight-user city-scale quantum communication network, located in Bristol, using already deployed fibres without active switching or trusted nodes.
 21 September – Researchers report the achievement of quantum entanglement between the motion of a millimetre-sized mechanical oscillator and a disparate distant spin system of a cloud of atoms.
 3 December – Chinese researchers claim to have achieved quantum supremacy, using a photonic peak 76-qubit system (43 average) known as Jiuzhang, which performed calculations at 100 trillion times the speed of classical supercomputers.
 21 December – Publication of research of "counterfactual quantum communication" – whose first achievement was reported in 2017 – by which information can be exchanged without any physical particle traveling between observers and without quantum teleportation. The research suggests that this is based on some form of relation between the properties of modular angular momentum.

2021
 6 January – Chinese researchers report that they have built the world's largest integrated quantum communication network, combining over 700 optical fibers with two QKD-ground-to-satellite links for a total distance between nodes of the network of networks of up to ~4,600 km.
 13 January – Austrian researchers report the first realization of an entangling gate between two logical qubits encoded in topological quantum error-correction codes using a trapped-ion quantum computer with 10 ions.
 15 January – Researchers in China report the successful transmission of entangled photons between drones, used as nodes for the development of mobile quantum networks or flexible network extensions, marking the first work in which entangled particles were sent between two moving devices.
 28 January – Swiss and German researchers report the development of a highly efficient single-photon source for quantum IT with a system of gated quantum dots in a tunable microcavity which captures photons released from these excited "artificial atoms".
 5 February – Researchers demonstrate a first prototype of quantum-logic gates for distributed quantum computers.
 13 April – In a preprint, an astronomer describes for the first time how one could search for quantum communication transmissions sent by extraterrestrial intelligence using existing telescope and receiver technology. He also provides arguments for why future searches of SETI should also target interstellar quantum communications.
 7 May – Two studies complement research published September 2020  by quantum-entangling two mechanical oscillators.
 8 June – A Japanese tech company achieves quantum communications over optical fibres exceeding 600 km in length, a new world record distance.

 17 June – Austrian, German and Swiss researchers present a two 19-inch rack quantum computing demonstrator, the world's first quality standards-meeting compact quantum computer.
 7 July – American researchers present a programmable quantum simulator that can operate with 256 qubits, and on the same date and journal another team presented quantum simulator of 196 Rydeberg atoms trapped in optical tweezers
 25 October – Chinese researchers reported that they have developed the world's fastest programmable quantum computers. The photon-based Jiuzhang 2 is claimed to be able to calculate a task in one millisecond, that would otherwise had taken a conventional computer 30 trillion years to complete. And Zuchongzhi 2 is a 66-qubit programmable superconducting quantum computer that is claimed to be the current world's fastest quantum computer that can run a calculation task one million times more complex than Google's Sycamore, as well as being 10 million times faster.
 11 November – The first simulation of baryons on a quantum computer is reported by University of Waterloo.
 16 November – IBM claims that it has created a new 127 quantum bit processor, 'IBM Eagle', which according to a report is the most powerful quantum processor known. According to the report, the company has not yet published an academic paper describing its metrics, performance or abilities.

2022
 18 January – Europe's first quantum annealer with more than 5,000 qubits is launched in Jülich, Germany.
 24 March – The first prototype, photonic, quantum memristive device, for neuromorphic (quantum-)computers and artificial neural networks, that is "able to produce memristive dynamics on single-photon states through a scheme of measurement and classical feedback" is invented.
 14 April – The Quantinuum System Model H1-2 doubled its performance claiming to be the first commercial quantum computer to pass quantum volume 4096.
 26 May – A universal set of computational operations on fault-tolerant quantum bits is demonstrated by a team of experimental physicists in Innsbruck, Austria.
 22 June – The world's first quantum computer integrated circuit is demonstrated.
28 June – Physicists report that interstellar quantum communication by other civilizations could be possible and may be advantageous, identifying some potential challenges and factors for detecting such. They may use, for example, X-ray photons for remotely established quantum communications and quantum teleportation as the communication mode.
 21 July – A universal qudit quantum processor is demonstrated with trapped ions.
 15 August – Nature Materials publishes the first work showing optical initialization and coherent control of nuclear spin qubits in 2D materials (an ultrathin hexagonal boron nitride).
 24 August – Nature publishes the first research related to a set of 14 photons entangled with high efficiency and in a defined way.
 26 August – Created photon pairs at several different frequencies using optical ultra-thin resonant metasurfaces made up of arrays of nanoresonators.
 29 August – Researchers generated up to 14 stable photons in an optical resonator nearly half the time and through "a scalable and freely programmable source."
 29 August – Physicists at the Max Planck Institute entangled 14 photons together, starting from an atom of rubidium, trapped in an optical cavity that bounces electromagnetic waves around in certain patterns.
  2 September – Researchers from The University of Tokyo and other Japanese institutions developed a systematic method that applies optimal control theory (GRAPE algorithm) to identify the theoretically optimal sequence from among all conceivable quantum operation sequences. It is necessary to complete the operations within the time that the coherent quantum state is maintained.
 30 September – Researchers at University of New South Wales achieved a coherence time of two milliseconds, 100 times higher than the previous benchmark in the same quantum processor.
 9 November – IBM presents its 433-qubit 'Osprey' quantum processor, the successor to its Eagle system.

2023 
 3 February – At the University of Innsbruck researchers have entangled two ions over a distance of 230 meters.

 8 February - Alpine Quantum Technologies (AQT) has demonstrated a quantum volume of 128 on its 19-inch rack-compatible quantum computer system PINE – a new record in Europe.

See also
 List of companies involved in quantum computing or communication
 List of quantum processors
 :Category:Quantum information scientists
 Timeline of computing 2020–present

References

Quantum computing
Quantum
Quantum
Quantum information science